The Deputies of the 9th Saeima are the 100 deputies or members of the parliament of Latvia, the Saeima. Ninety-nine of those elected to 9th Saeima began their term on 7 November 2006, and ended their term on 2 November 2010. However in total including deputies with mandates and others, the 9th Saeima had 116 working members.

Members of the 9th Saeima 
The list has 116 people, all in alphabetical order of the deputies of the Saeima. Names in italics did not attend a full term of the Saeima.

External links
 Deputies at the Saeima website

 
Lists of political office-holders in Latvia